Li Haonan may refer to:
 Li Haonan (speed skater)
 Li Haonan (basketball)